Menegazzia elongata is a species of corticolous (bark-dwelling), foliose lichen found in Australia. It was formally described as a new species by lichenologist Peter J. James in 1992. The type specimen was collected by Leif Tibell in Tasmania.

See also
List of Menegazzia species

References

elongata
Lichen species
Lichens described in 1992
Lichens of Australia
Taxa named by Peter Wilfred James